Winfield Township is one of nine townships in DuPage County, Illinois, USA. As of the 2010 census, its population was 46,233 and it contained 15,856 housing units. It is the least populous of the DuPage County Townships.

Geography

Cities, towns, villages
 Aurora (northeast edge)
 Batavia (partial)
 Naperville (partial)
 Warrenville (northwest three-quarters)
 West Chicago (partial)
 Wheaton (partial)
 Winfield (partial)

Unincorporated towns
 Geneva Road at 
 High Lake at 
 Warrenhurst at 
(This list is based on USGS data and may include former settlements.)

Ghost Town
 Weston at

Adjoining Townships
 Wayne Township, DuPage County (north)
 Bloomingdale Township, DuPage County (northeast)
 Milton Township, DuPage County (east)
 Lisle Township, DuPage County (southeast)
 Naperville Township, DuPage County (south)
 Aurora Township, Kane County (southwest)
 Geneva Township, Kane County (west)
 Batavia Township, Kane County (west)
 St. Charles Township, Kane County (northwest)

Cemeteries
The township contains these seven cemeteries: Assumption, Big Woods, Calvary, Glen Oak, Oakwood, Pioneer and Warrenville.

Major highways
  Illinois Route 38
  Illinois Route 56
  Illinois Route 59

Airports and landing strips
 Central Dupage Heliport
 DuPage Airport (south three-quarters)

Lakes
 High Lake
 Loveless Lake
 Spring Lake

Landmarks
 DuPage County Forest Preserve - Kline Creek Farm
 DuPage County Forest Preserve - Roy C Blackwell Preserve
 Fermi National Accelerator Laboratory
 Illinois Department of Corrections Youth Center (north quarter)

Demographics

School districts
 Community High School District 94
 Winfield Elementary School District 34
 West Chicago Elementary School District 33
 Community Unit School District 200
 Indian Prairie Community Unit School District 204

Political districts
 Illinois's 14th congressional district
 Illinois's 6th congressional district
 State House District 95
 State House District 96
 State Senate District 48

Notable person
Donald Hensel (1926-2012), Illinois state representative; Hensel born in Winfield Township.

References
 
 United States Census Bureau 2008 TIGER/Line Shapefiles
 United States National Atlas

External links
 City-Data.com
 Illinois State Archives
 Township Officials of Illinois

Townships in DuPage County, Illinois
1849 establishments in Illinois
Townships in Illinois